The 1991–92 Northeast Louisiana Indians men's basketball team represented the Northeast Louisiana University in the 1991–92 NCAA Division I men's basketball season. The Indians, led by head coach Mike Vining, played their home games at Fant–Ewing Coliseum in Monroe, Louisiana, as members of the Southland Conference. They finished the season 19–10, 12–6 in Southland play to finished in second place. They followed the regular season by winning the Southland tournament to earn an automatic bid to the NCAA tournament as No. 15 seed in the Midwest region. Northeast Louisiana fell to No. 2 seed USC in the opening round, 84–54.

Roster

Schedule and results

|-
!colspan=9 style=| Regular season

|-
!colspan=9 style=| Southland tournament

|-
!colspan=9 style=| NCAA Tournament

Awards and honors
Ryan Stuart – Southland Player of the Year

References

Louisiana–Monroe Warhawks men's basketball seasons
Northeast Louisiana
Northeast Louisiana
Louisiana-Monroe Warhawks men's basketball
Louisiana-Monroe Warhawks men's basketball